The following lists events that happened during 2014 in the Republic of Azerbaijan.

Incumbents
 President: Ilham Aliyev
 Prime Minister: Artur Rasizade
 Speaker: Ogtay Asadov

Events

February 

 February 13 - National Congress of Honduras recognizes Azerbaijani territories and Khojaly Massacre

March 

 March 3 - US State of Indiana recognizes the Khojaly Massacre

April 

 April 16 - Inauguration of the National Gymnastics Arena in Baku
 April 23 - Opening of the new air terminal complex at the Heydar Aliyev International Airport
 April 28 - Official opening of the Second Global Open Society Forum in Baku

May 

 May 5 - Inauguration of new buildings of the Central Library of the Azerbaijan National Academy of Sciences and "National Encyclopedia of Azerbaijan" Scientific Centre

June 

 June 5 - The 4th Summit of the Cooperation Council of Turkic Speaking States (Turkic Council)

August
 August 1 - At least eight Azeri soldiers are killed following clashes with Armenian troops on the border and near the disputed Nagorno-Karabakh region. Azerbaijan said Armenia had also suffered losses, although it did not provide any details.
 August 2 - Five more Azeri troops are killed in overnight fighting with ethnic Armenians in Nagorno-Karabakh. The casualties bring the death toll to at least 13 in a flare-up of violence over the last few days around Nagorno-Karabakh. Russia has said that any further escalation is unacceptable.
 August 3 - Four Azerbaijani soldiers are killed in fresh clashes with Armenian groups near the border of the breakaway Nagorno-Karabakh Republic.
 August 9 - Azerbaijan's President Ilham Aliyev declares a ‘state of war’ with Armenia on Twitter saying "We are not living in peace, we are living in a state of war".

September 

 September 1 - Foreign Affairs Committee of Sudan recognizes Khojaly Massacre
 September 20 - Foundation stone-laying ceremony of the Southern Gas Corridor

October 

 October 2 - The 4th International Humanitarian Forum was held in Baku

November
 November 12 - Azerbaijan shoots down an Armenian Mil Mi-24 military helicopter.

December 

 December 26 - Inauguration of Heydar Mosque in Baku

References

 
2010s in Azerbaijan
Years of the 21st century in Azerbaijan
Azerbaijan
Azerbaijan
Azerbaijan